There are two species of gecko named South American marked gecko:
 Homonota horrida
 Homonota fasciata